Andrew Greenberg is a game designer of tabletop role-playing games and role-playing video games.

Career
Greenberg was one of White Wolf Publishing's original developers on Vampire: The Masquerade (1991). He was the line editor for Vampire, and as one of the early World of Darkness developers, he helped develop the look and tone of that series. He authored the supplement Chicago by Night. After years with White Wolf, he joined Holistic Design, Inc. (HDI), where he co-created Fading Suns (1996) with Bill Bridges. Greenberg managed video game development at Holistic and worked on computer games like Emperor of the Fading Suns and Mall Tycoon. He was a co-writer of Dracula Unleashed. Greenberg produced a d20 version of the role-playing game Rapture: The Second Coming (2002).

Greenberg helped found the Mythic Imagination Institute and is co-chair of the Mythic Journeys convention. In 2007, he began teaching video game design classes at the Art Institute of Atlanta.

Sources

References

External links
 Andrew Greenberg at Goodreads
 Andrew Greenberg at MobyGames

Living people
Year of birth missing (living people)
Role-playing game designers
White Wolf game designers
American video game designers